The Minister responsible for Multiculturalism was a government position in the province of Manitoba, Canada. The position was created in 1991, when Bonnie Mitchelson was designated as Minister of Multiculturalism in the government of Gary Filmon. The position was not a full ministerial portfolio and was always held by a member of government with other responsibilities.

In 2012, responsibility for multiculturalism was transferred to the Minister of Immigration and Multiculturalism.

List of Ministers responsible for Multiculturalism

References 

Multiculturalism, Minister responsible for
Multiculturalism in Canada